Seoul Transportation Corporation, branded as  Seoul Metro, is a municipal-owned corporation owned by Seoul Metropolitan Government, and one of the two major operators of Seoul Metropolitan Subway with Korail.

History
 May 31, 2017: Seoul Transportation Corporation is formed after a merger of Seoul Metro Corporation and Seoul Metropolitan Rapid Transit Corporation to more efficiently operate services on lines 1–9.

Lines and sections
Seoul Metro's service covers part of lines 1, 3, 4 and all of lines 2, 5, 6, 7, 8 & 9. Trains from Lines 1, 3 and 4 through operate with Korail services. Seoul Metro controls the railways and stations owned by the Seoul Metropolitan Government.

Depots
 Gunja Depot - for Lines 1 & 2
 Sinjeong Depot - for Line 2
 Jichuk Depot - for Line 3 (heavy maintenance for Line 4)
 Suseo Depot - for Line 3
 Chang-dong Depot - for Line 4
 Godeok Depot - for Line 5 (heavy maintenance for Line 8)
 Banghwa Depot - for Line 5
 Sinnae Depot - for Line 6
 Dobong Depot - for Line 7 (heavy maintenance for Line 6)
 Cheonwang Depot - for Line 7
 Moran Depot - for Line 8
 Gimpo Depot - for Line 9

Subway etiquette with Bread Barbershop characters
In June 2020, the etiquette was uploaded on both YouTube channels, their own YouTube channel, and the Korean Bread Barbershop channel. The company said that they can meet Master Bread and his friends on June 10, 2020. The etiquette promotes that bringing food in a subway is prohibited.

See also 
 Korail
 Seoul Metropolitan Rapid Transit Corporation
 List of rapid transit systems
 List of urban rail systems by length
 Seoul Metropolitan Subway stations
 Transportation in South Korea

References

External links 

 Official Website of Seoul Metro
 Seoul Metropolitan City Government

Seoul Metropolitan Subway
Railway companies of South Korea
Transport operators of South Korea
Railway companies established in 2017
Companies based in Seoul
2017 establishments in South Korea